County Route 529 (CR 529) is a county highway in the U.S. state of New Jersey. The highway extends  from Woodbridge Avenue (CR 514) in Edison to Mountain Boulevard (CR 527) in Watchung.

Route description
CR 529 begins at an intersection with CR 514 in Edison, Middlesex County, heading north on two-lane undivided Plainfield Avenue. The road passes through residential areas before reaching an intersection with US 1 in commercial areas. Past this intersection, the route passes more suburban neighborhoods as it crosses Route 27 near more businesses and begins to turn northwest. The road passes under Amtrak's Northeast Corridor near the Edison Station on NJ Transit's Northeast Corridor Line. From here, CR 529 heads north as a four-lane undivided road that passes near industrial and commercial development with some homes. The road enters Piscataway Township, where the name becomes Stelton Road and narrows back to two lanes, passing a mix of homes and businesses. After an intersection with CR 501, the route runs northwest along the border between Piscataway Township to the west and South Plainfield to the east as a four-lane undivided road into commercial areas, soon widening into a divided highway at the CR 609 intersection. The divided highway portion of CR 529 ends as it comes to an interchange with I-287.

From this interchange, the route intersects CR 603 and enters areas of homes and businesses, turning west into industrial areas again fully within Piscataway Township again. After joining with CR 665, CR 529 makes a sharp turn north, crossing Conrail Shared Assets Operations' Port Reading Secondary line and CR 665 splits from the road to the west. At this point, the route becomes two-lane Washington Avenue and runs north through residential areas, passing over New Market Pond and Conrail Shared Assets Operations' Lehigh Line on a bridge. Farther north, the road crosses CR 601 before heading into Dunellen. In this area, CR 529 begins to turn more to the northwest, intersecting CR 678 and CR 665 before passing under NJ Transit's Raritan Valley Line near the Dunellen Station. Immediately after, the route crosses Route 28 in the commercial downtown of Dunellen. Following this, CR 529 passes more homes before crossing into Green Brook Township, Somerset County in a wooded area. At this point, the route widens to four lanes and enters commercial areas, crossing CR 634 prior to reaching an intersection with US 22. After US 22, CR 529 begins to ascend First Watchung Mountain and winds northeast into Washington Rock State Park, with the road name changing to Washington Rock Road East. The road curves northwest into Watchung and heads through wooded residential neighborhoods, descending the mountain as CR 529 comes to its north end at CR 527.

Major intersections

See also

References

External links 

NJ State Highways: CR 515-530
CR 529 pictures

529
529
529